Francisco Antonio de Agurto y Salcedo, 1st Marquess of Gastañaga (1640 – 2 November 1702) was a Spanish nobleman, viceroy and governor of Basque origin.

He was born in Vitoria. He became first Marquess de Gastañaga in 1676 and was Governor of the Habsburg Netherlands between 1685 and 1692. He led the Spanish troops in the Battle of Fleurus (1690) and unsuccessfully defended Mons against the French. He began a new royal chapel of Saint Joseph in Waterloo in 1687 an attempt to curry favour with the court, but was recalled to Madrid for his failure to hold Mons. After this he became Viceroy of Catalonia between 1694 and 1696, where he was confronted with a French invasion during the War of the Grand Alliance.

He never married, and died in Zaragoza. After his death, the title of Marquess of Gastañaga went to his brother, Iñigo Eugenio (1648–1715).

External links
 

1640 births
1702 deaths
People from Vitoria-Gasteiz
Margraves of Gastañaga
Governors of the Habsburg Netherlands
Viceroys of Catalonia
Spanish generals
Military personnel of the Nine Years' War